Janice Birch (née Bremner) (born July 15, 1974) was a Canadian competitor and Olympic medalist in synchronized swimming.

Career 
Birch began synchronized swimming in the late 1980s, but was most successful in the 1990s. Birch competed with the Canadian Synchronized Swimming Team, where they won a Silver Medal in 1994, at the World Aquatics Championships, and again at the 1995 Pan American Games. In the 1996 Summer Olympics in Atlanta, Birch and team members Christine Larsen, Sylvie Fréchette, and Valérie Hould-Marchand, won another Silver Medal. Soon after the 1996 Olympic Games, Birch retired from competitive swimming and began studying at the University of British Columbia. Birch helped carry the Olympic Torch for the 2010 Winter Olympics in Vancouver, British Columbia.

Personal life 
Birch graduated from UBC in 1999, and worked in fitness and health education. She now resides with her family in the Lower Mainland in British Columbia and is married with four children.

References

External links

1974 births
Living people
Canadian synchronized swimmers
Olympic silver medalists for Canada
Olympic synchronized swimmers of Canada
Synchronized swimmers at the 1996 Summer Olympics
Olympic medalists in synchronized swimming
Medalists at the 1996 Summer Olympics
Pan American Games medalists in synchronized swimming
Synchronized swimmers at the 1995 Pan American Games
Pan American Games silver medalists for Canada
Medalists at the 1995 Pan American Games